Tolskithy is a hamlet west of Redruth in Cornwall, England, United Kingdom.

References

Hamlets in Cornwall